Ouellé Department is a department of Iffou Region, Ivory Coast. In 2021, its population was 56,501 and its seat is the settlement of Ouellé. The sub-prefectures of the department are Ouellé, Akpassanou, and Ananda.

History
Ouellé Department was created in 2020 by taking 3 sub-prefectures from the Daoukro Department. Ouellé Department is the most recently created department in Ivory Coast.

Notes

States and territories established in 2020